Nurul Fikri Boarding School Serang (Pesantren Ibnu Salam, also known by the abbreviation NFBS) is a secondary and high school located in Jalan Palka, Cinangka, Serang, Banten, Indonesia.

History 
The late Malik Abdus Salam gave his land to Nurul Fikri Foundation to build a school then. It started operation in 1999 with 48 students and 10 teachers with some employees. And then, Nurul Fikri Boarding School was given facilities by some muhsinin or helpers from WAMY and another foundation. Our way of life is PANTAS, we have our own government, we have our own ideology, Cerdas, Sholeh, Muslih.

Until now, the Nurul Fikri Boarding School has issued six alma mater from year 2002 to 2013.

Development
Since its inception, Nurul Fikri has developed to be an Integrated Islamic School. And then, in 2005, NFBS get the predicate from Indonesian Ministry of Education as a National Standard School. And now Nurul Fikri has some students that come from overseas, like Malaysia, Pakistan, Brunei or even Saudi Arabia.

Facility
Here are the facilities currently available:
Chemistry laboratory
Physics laboratory
Computer laboratory
Electronic laboratory
Sport center
Basketball field
Football field
Futsal field
Swimming pool
Archery range
Outbound facilities
Badminton field
Mini theater
Libraries
Masjid
Greenhouse
Maintenance service
Laundry service
Canteen
Minimarket

List of principals 

Drs. Idris Azhar
Mr.Muhammad Damiri, M.Pd
Drs. Syaurium Sy Khatib

Current administrators 

 Principal: KH. Achmad Munaji Istamar, Lc 
 Junior High School/Secondary Headmaster: Mrs. Irmawati, S.Pd
 Senior High School Headmaster: Mr. Hari Untung Maulana, M.Pd

Educational institutions established in 1999
Secondary schools in Indonesia
Schools in Banten
1999 establishments in Indonesia